Patrick John Galvin  (born 17 March 1933) is a retired senior Australian public servant. He was Secretary of the Department of Arts, Heritage and Environment between 1984 and 1987.

Life and career
Galvin was born in Adelaide, South Australia, on 17 March 1933. His father, also called Pat Galvin, was an Australian Labor Party member of the House of Representatives.

Galvin joined the Australian Public Service in 1950, with a personnel cadetship that enabled him to obtain an arts degree from the University of Adelaide.

Whilst working in the Department of External Territories, Galvin served in Papua New Guinea.

In 1982, Galvin was appointed as a Deputy Secretary in the Department of Home Affairs and Environment. He was appointed Secretary of the Department in July 1984, having acted in the role since February that year. A departmental reshuffle in December 1984 saw him transitioning to become Secretary of the Department of Arts, Heritage and Environment.

Galvin retired from the public service in 1988, and moved to Brisbane with his wife Dr Lenore Manderson who had been appointed to a position at the University of Queensland.

Awards
In January 1991, Galvin was made a Member of the Order of Australia in recognition of his services to heritage, the arts and the Public Service.

References

1933 births
Living people
Australian public servants
Members of the Order of Australia
Australian people of Irish descent
People from Adelaide
University of Adelaide alumni